Djihad! is a 2006 French drama television film by director and writer Félix Olivier.

Plot
The lives and destinies of five French characters intersect during the Iraq War. Three young French Arabs (Cherif, Karim, and Youssef) each for a different reason joins a jihadi group to fight against the Americans. Delphine LeGuen, a 40-something French woman running an NGO in Baghdad at the outbreak of the war, gets kidnapped and held by the jihadi insurgents. Meanwhile, a mid-level French diplomat, Hugo Bessieres, uncovers French corruption of the UN Oil for Food program while gathering evidence to support his country's effort to prevent the war.

Cast

 Adel Bencherif as Karim
 Marianne Denicourt as Delphine Le Guen
 Thierry Frémont as Hugo Bessières
 Saïd Taghmaoui as Youssef
 Slimane Hadjar as Chérif

Accolades

External links
 

Iraq War in television
2006 films
French television films